Jean-Yves Bony (born 11 March 1955) is a French farmer and politician of the Republicans.

Political career
Bony has been mayor of the commune of Ally in the Cantal department since March 2001 and vice-president of the Communauté de communes du Pays de Salers, created in 2004. He is also president of the Ally/Escorailles/Brageac Syndicat des Eaux (water company) and president of the retirement home of Ally.

A general councillor in Cantal, representing the Canton de Pleaux, he was the eighth vice-president of the Cantal General Council.

A Suppléant of Alain Marleix at the general election in June 2007, Bony became deputy of the 2nd circonscription of Cantal when the latter became Secretary of State for Veterans on 19 June 2007 in the second government of François Fillon. Marleix was re-elected in 2012.

In parliament, Bony serves on the Committee on Sustainable Development and Spatial Planning. In addition to his committee assignments, he is part of the French-Cuban Parliamentary Friendship Group.

Political positions
In the Republicans’ 2017 leadership election, Bony endorsed Laurent Wauquiez. Ahead of the 2022 presidential elections, he publicly declared his support for Michel Barnier as the Republicans’ candidate.

References 

1955 births
Living people
Deputies of the 15th National Assembly of the French Fifth Republic
Union for a Popular Movement politicians
The Republicans (France) politicians
Departmental councillors (France)
Deputies of the 16th National Assembly of the French Fifth Republic